The 2009–10 UEFA Champions League group stage matches took place between 15 September and 9 December 2009. The draw for the eight groups took place on 27 August 2009, at the Grimaldi Forum in Monaco.

The group stage featured the 22 automatic qualifiers and the 10 winners of the play-off round (five through the Champions Path, five through the Non-Champions Path).

After the completion of the group stage, the top two teams in each group advanced to play in the first knockout round, while the third-placed teams dropped down to the UEFA Europa League round of 32.

Seedings
The draw for the group stage was held in Monaco on 27 August 2009.

Seeding was determined by the UEFA coefficients: Pot 1 held teams ranked 1–8, Pot 2 held teams ranked 10–28, Pot 3 held teams ranked 34–64, while Pot 4 held teams ranked 97–190 and unranked teams.

Clubs from the same association were paired up to split the matchdays between Tuesday and Wednesday. Clubs with the same pairing letter played on different days, ensuring that teams from the same city (e.g. Milan and Inter Milan, who also share a stadium) did not play on the same day.

th Title holder

c Qualified through Play-off round (Champions Path)

n Qualified through Play-off round (Non-Champions Path)

Tie-breaking criteria
Based on Article 7.06 in the UEFA regulations, if two or more teams are equal on points on completion of the group matches, the following criteria will be applied to determine the rankings:
higher number of points obtained in the group matches played among the teams in question;
superior goal difference from the group matches played among the teams in question;
higher number of goals scored away from home in the group matches played among the teams in question;
superior goal difference from all group matches played;
higher number of goals scored;
higher number of coefficient points accumulated by the club in question, as well as its association, over the previous five seasons.

Groups
Times are CET/CEST, as listed by UEFA (local times are in parentheses).

Group A

Notes
Note 1: Juventus played their home group matches at the Stadio Olimpico di Torino as their Stadio delle Alpi was demolished to make way for Juventus Stadium.
Note 2: Maccabi Haifa played their home group matches at the Ramat Gan Stadium in Tel Aviv District as their Kiryat Eliezer Stadium did not meet UEFA criteria.

Group B

Group C

Group D

Group E

Notes
Note 3: Debrecen played their home group matches at Ferenc Puskás Stadium in Budapest as their Stadion Oláh Gábor Út did not meet UEFA criteria.

Group F

Group G

Notes
Note 4: Unirea Urziceni played their home group matches at Stadionul Steaua in Bucharest as their Stadionul Tineretului did not meet UEFA criteria.

Group H

Notes

References

External links
2009–10 UEFA Champions League, UEFA.com

Group Stage
UEFA Champions League group stages